The Bond 875 was a small three-wheeled car partly designed by Lawrence "Lawrie" Bond and manufactured by Bond Cars Ltd in Preston, United Kingdom from 1965 to 1970. There was also a van version from 1967, known as the Ranger.

The car was announced in August 1965, though volume production got under way only during the summer of 1966. The 875 used the lower-compression (8:1) four-cylinder 875 cc 34 b.h.p. four-stroke engine used in the Commer Imp Van from the Rootes Group. Crucially for the dynamics of the vehicle, this was rear-mounted, unlike in most other British three-wheelers of the era. It was the same basic layout as used in the Hillman Imp, installed as a complete package along with the Imps' transmission, rear suspension and rear wheels. The low-compression engine meant it was able to run on "2-star" low-octane petrol, which was cheaper than varieties used by larger and more highly tuned engines.

The car's light weight enabled it to qualify for motorcycle road tax rates, and be driven on a motorcycle licence, but in order to keep the weight down, the interior trim and fittings were minimal.

Bond played on the car's sporty reputation, track testing a standard production version around the Silverstone Circuit in 1966, setting a lap time of 1:43.34 and reaching  through a timing trap along the Hanger Straight. Following the test, Bond refused to confirm or deny that they would be building a racing version of the car for 1967.

Development
A van version, the Ranger, was introduced in April 1967.

Styling changes, including rectangular headlamps, a new front grille, a larger bonnet opening, and revised seats, heralded the "Mark II", announced in April 1968. Other changes included the fitting of a heater as standard equipment.

Specification and performance
Capacity: 875 cc, 34 b.h.p.
Weight: < 
0-60 mph: 16 seconds 
Top speed:  
Fuel economy:  - 
Tyres: Michelin X radial
Price new: £500

Road test
The British Autocar magazine tested a Bond 875 in September 1966. The car's superior power-to-weight ratio converted into superior performance outcomes. That put it usefully ahead of the contemporary 850 cc Morris Mini on maximum speed and acceleration, as well as on fuel economy. The manufacturer's recommended price of the Bond was £506, which was higher than the £478 price for the Mini, but less than the recommended retail price of £549 for the comparably sized Imp. The testers commended the Bond's performance and economy, but found the three-wheeler unstable at high speed. They thought the gear box and brakes good, but were disappointed by "poor seats and detail finish".

References

External links
 Bond 875 at The Imp Site

Three-wheeled motor vehicles
Microcars
875
Cars introduced in 1965